This is a list of self-driving car system (SDS) suppliers.

Light vehicles (LV) include passenger cars, whereas heavy vehicles (HV) include Trucks and Buses.
Driverless operation means operating vehicles without a human safety driver.
Operational Design Domain (ODD) is the operating conditions in which the SDS can operate, which may be limited in the environment or traffic characteristics. A Restricted ODD is limited by design to specific areas or industries, for example highway driving only, or private-ground operation in mine sites or ports.

Light vehicles

Heavy vehicles

References 

 
Auto parts suppliers